Bob Hardy may refer to:
Bob Hardy (footballer) (born 1914), played for Hemsworth West End, South Kirkby Colliery, White Rose, Rotherham Utd, Mexborough Athletic, Denaby Utd, Dinnington Main Colliery Welfare, Rochdale, Grantham
Bob Hardy (bishop) (1936–2021), bishop of Lincoln
Bob Hardy (bassist) (born 1980), member of British band Franz Ferdinand